The City of Ringwood was a local government area about  east of Melbourne, the state capital of Victoria, Australia.

History

Ringwood was originally part of the Shire of Lillydale, which was incorporated as a road district on 19 September 1856, and as a shire in 1872. Ringwood itself was severed and incorporated as a borough on 22 October 1924. It was proclaimed a city on 19 March 1960.

On 15 December 1994, the City of Ringwood was abolished, and along with the City of Croydon, was merged into the City of Maroondah.

Council meetings were held at the Municipal Offices, on Mines Road, Ringwood. It presently serves as the council seat for the City of Maroondah.

Wards

The City of Ringwood was subdivided into three wards, each electing three councillors:
 North Ward
 South Ward
 East Ward

Suburbs
 Heathmont
 Ringwood*
 Ringwood East
 Ringwood North (shared with the City of Doncaster & Templestowe)

* Council seat.

Population

* Estimate in the 1958 Victorian Year Book.

References

External links
 Victorian Places - Ringwood

Ringwood
City of Maroondah
1924 establishments in Australia
1994 disestablishments in Australia
Ringwood, Victoria